Intruder is a 1993 Spanish film, written and directed by Vicente Aranda. It stars Victoria Abril,  Imanol Arias and Antonio Valero. The film is a psychological thriller about a middle-class woman torn between her love for her spouse and her ill ex-husband, both of them who were her childhood friends. Intruso received five nominations to the Goya Awards in 1994 including Best Picture.

Plot
Luisa, a middle-class housewife living in Santander, Northern Spain, has a comfortable existence with her husband Ramiro, who has a successful medico-dental career. They have two children, Ramirín and Ángela. One winter day, Luisa, stopping in a traffic light, spots her ex-husband, Ángel, who is selling tissues on the streets. After that brief encounter, the next day Luisa looks for Ángel in the area where she saw him before. She finds him wandering about the city in destitution. Overcome with sentimentality and, over Ramiro's objections, Luisa takes Ángel into her home in an effort to help him and rebuild the friendship the three of them once had. Luisa is convinced that destiny has reunited them.

Luisa, Ángel and Ramiro were inseparable friends during their childhood and youth. Once they became adults, they formed an uneasy love triangle in which the two men were rivals for Luisa's affection. Luisa married Ángel, but two years later, she left him to marry Ramiro, who she thought was the one she was meant to be with.

Ramiro is not pleased to see again his former friend who he wishfully presumed to be dead. Unwillingly, he accepts Ángel's presence. He thought Ángel was working in construction living a prosperous life in South America. However, after his divorce from Luisa, Ángel spent all his money in a restless life. He reappears after more than ten years of absence, broke and ill.

Ángel still loves Luisa and has never overcome his feelings of resentment about their divorce. He still wears the ring she gave him in their first and only wedding anniversary. The ring has the inscription: P.R.E.O.M. that stands for: To be reunited in the other world.
 
Initially overwhelmed by Luisa's mystical and deranged streak, Ángel tries to leave but Luisa's daughter Ángela brings him back home. He has fits, foaming, and bleeding in the mouth. Medical results show that he is terminally ill. Soon, Ramiro and Ángel shift from friends to enemies and have a bitter confrontation. Luisa is torn between them. She loves Ángel as a part of herself, but also loves her husband and beyond reason, wants to have them both.

Ángel establishes a friendship with the couple's little children, Ramirin and Ángela. The girl is more sympathetic and the boy, always taking his father side, is a little hostile. Ángel spellbinds them both with his offbeat stories and his directness. He takes them on a short trip to the beach where he reenacts with them a scene from his own childhood. He sees in the children the reflection of his own youth and his erstwhile friendship with Luisa and Ramiro. While Ángel is at the beach, Ramiro and Luisa find out that Ángel is terminally ill and has very little time to live. Ramiro hopes he can wait out Ángel's declining health, while Luisa does not accept the medical verdict. As Ángel's health worsens, Luisa insists upon caring for him in the house rather than sending him off to a hospital. He is soon bedridden and in constant pain. Luisa makes love to him, and when she returns to Ramiro in their bedroom, she has sex with her husband. She loves them both intensely and equally.

When Ángel's condition worsens, he falls into a coma; Luisa, through force of will alone, brings him back to life to the astonishment of her husband and children. She takes Ángel to bed, and in spite of his illness makes love to him. She does not deceive her husband; she tells him so right after. Ramiro takes the information with resignation knowing that the end is near for his rival. When Ángel is at death's door, Ramiro prepares a lethal doze of anesthetic to accelerate his death. In the final moment, the dying man makes a final, desperate bid to steal his ex-wife away from her spouse. He grasps the hypodermic needle with its overdose of anesthetic and kills Ramiro. Dragging himself to his rival's marital bed, Ángel dies next to Luisa. Luisa then takes a ring with P.R.E.O.M. written on the inside from her dresser and puts it on the now-dead Ramiro, to bring the two ex-friends and rivals together in the afterlife.  Luisa and the children follow two funeral cars to the cemetery, with both coffins having the inscriptions written: to be reunited in the other world.

Production
Intruso  was originated with the international success of Amantes, a film, like Intruso, directed by Vicente Aranda, scripted by him with the collaboration of Alvaro del Amo and produced by Pedro Costa. Vicente Aranda was filming El Amante Bilingüe when Pedro Costa suggested to him to make what would become Intruso.  Aranda was still filming El Amante Bilingüe but he started pre-production before finishing the previous film.

Intruso began to be filmed just days after the conclusion of El Amante Bilingüe. Both films appeared in 1993. El Amante Bilingüe opened in theaters in April 1994 and Intruso six months later.

Cast
After teaming in Amantes, director Vicente Aranda and star Victoria Abril reunited again in Intruso, their ninth collaboration.

Imanol Arias plays the role of Ángel, a man who his life destroyed by those who now are giving him shelter. He becomes the catalyst of the conflicting love triangle in which their encounter derives. Imanol Arias had worked with Vicente Aranda before in El Lute, a film that was an artistic and commercial success. He was also the star of Aranda's previous film El Amante Bilingüe.

The role of the husband, after being declined by other actors, fell on Antonio Valero, who had worked with Vicente Aranda and Imanol Arias in El Lute. Naím Thomas, who played Ángel as a child, has had a successful acting and singing career in Spain.

Imanol Arias as Ángel
Victoria Abril as Luisa
 Antonio Valero as Ramiro
 Alicia Rozas as Ángela
 Carlos Moreno as Ramirín
 Rebeca Roizo as Luisa as a child
 Naím Thomas as Ángel as a child
 Alejandro Sánchez as Ramiro as a child
 Alicia Agut as Juliana

Themes
One of the main themes of Intruso is the destructive potential of obsessive passion and its links with death and sex. Intruso forms with Amantes (1991) and Celos (1999) a trilogy of films about love as uncontrollable passion that ends tragically. These three films directed by Vicente Aranda are loosely based in real crime stories.

Analysis
Intruso concern an impossible love triangle that ends in murder. Aranda's direction is concise, its style austere, unadorned and atoned with the claustrophobic and dark atmosphere of the film. Jose Luis Alcaine's cinematography is dark and cold. The camera has a fondness for darkened bedrooms intense two- shots winter light according to the dark plot line.

Some elements of Intruso resemble Emily Brontë's novel Wuthering Heights. Luisa assertion that she loves Ángel like a part of herself is similar to Catherine Earnshaw's close self-identification with Heathcliff in the novel. Luisa's love for Ángel and Ramiro also resembles Catherine Earnshaw's split interest between Edgar Linton and Heathcliff. Luisa like Catherine has chosen the placid commodity of a quiet life with Edgar (Ramiro ) over the riskiest alternative of  Heathcliff (Ángel).The rivalry of  the two former friends for Luisa's affection also resembles Edgar and Heathcliff dispute over Catherine. Ángel as Heathcliff comes back after years of absence to disrupt the couple's life. Luisa's attitude to Ángel's illness reflects Heathcliff's reaction to Catherine's death. Novel and film end  in the graveyard.

In once scene, Ángel and Ramiro are in Ramiro's consulting room. The drama is heightened by strong white light from the windows. Ángel tells him directly of his hatred for him, of the atrocious tortures he has imagined in the years of absence. Ramiro takes a step towards him and equally directly gives him his version of " the painful truth ", that Luisa made a mistake marrying Ángel and corrected it by marrying Ramiro. The white light on his face heightens his chilly candor. The reverse shot shows Ángel, now with tears and intensity on his face. The two men swap positions and Ángel's rage and desperation increases. Again, they are face to face, closer now than before. Violently Ángel grasps Ramiro by the arms and to the words "I still love her madly," kisses him ferociously first in both cheeks and then with ambiguous intensity and eyes closed, kisses him on the lips, underlying the pure vengeful intent. Ramiro is forced into being a momentary fantasy substitution for Luisa. There is another interpretation, that of a homoerotic undercurrent, from the intensity of the adolescent triangle. Ramiro's reaction is of a threat with his fits, "if you that again I'll punch you face in." The scene carries the classic violence of homosocial rivalry over into the arena of male rape, and yet it allows for a violent tenderness, not between Angel and Ramiro now, but between Ángel and what he has lost.

Ángel makes a triumphant, vehement, and sensuality charged confession to Ramiro on the way from the clinic on the day of the news, that he has slept with Luisa again. Ramiro's reaction is a mixture of misplaced loyalty, emotional dysfunction, and self-interest, all conformed with the codes of male friendship. Acting as he does, Ramiro's attitude bring upon him and his family the tragedy of the double murder, because he understands neither his wife nor the situation.

The mystical and sometimes deranged character of Luisa is formed of sheer emotion and feeling. In the most impressive scene of the films, Luisa revived the comatose Ángel  with sheer vital force, without any help, she drags him to the swimming pool, where she introduces his head in the water, which makes him react. At the same time, she has to carry a weight superior to her own and in front of her husband and children, who are witness of the miracle of Ángel's resurrection. Luisa very riotously exhorts Ángel to open his eyes and live in a monologue that is a beautiful declaration of love. "Wake up, I order it to you. Repeat with me, I don't wanna die, I don't wanna die.
Live for me, so I can tell you, I love you, I love you, a million times. Live, so you can look at yourself in my eyes, so you can feel the warmest of my hands in your forehead. Look at that (pointing out to the moon) she is there, more beautiful than ever, she reflects tomorrow's light. Don't you wanna see the morning's sun? Open your eyes, tell your name aloud, I order you to yell your name (she slaps him and continues). Hold on; help me, fight for your life. It is inside of you what doesn't let you live. Spit it out. You have to live for me (she lays him down on the edge of the swimming pool), I shouldn't have left you. I want you to feel pain, pain, the pain of being alive (she submerges his head in the water until the dying man reacts, coughing) Tell your name, I'm Angel and I wanna live (he complies) "Wait for me, I'm Angel".

Reception
Intruso did not enjoy the commercial or critical success of Amantes.

Accolades
 Five Goya Awards Nominations: Best Film, Best Director, Best Actor (Imanol Arias), Best editing, Best Score (1994)
 Fotogramas de Plata: Best Movie Actress (Victoria Abril)

DVD release
Intruso is available on DVD in Spanish with English subtitles.

Bibliography
Cánovás Belchí, Joaquín (ed.), Varios Autores,: Miradas sobre el cine de Vicente Aranda, Murcia: Universidad de Murcia, 2000.P. Madrid
Colmena, Enrique: Vicente Aranda, Cátedra, Madrid, 1986, 
 Perriam, Christopher: "Stars and Masculinities in Spanish Cinema: From Banderas to Bardem", Oxford University Press, 2003,

External links 
 

1993 films
1993 drama films
1990s Spanish-language films
Films directed by Vicente Aranda
Spanish drama films
1990s Spanish films
Spanish psychological thriller films